Natalia Pervaiz (born 25 December 1995) is a Pakistani cricketer who plays as a right-arm medium bowler and right-handed batter. She appeared in three One Day Internationals and 11 Twenty20 Internationals for Pakistan in 2017 and 2018. She has played domestic cricket for Higher Education Commission, Hyderabad and State Bank of Pakistan.

She made her Twenty20 International debut against New Zealand on 9 November 2017. She made her One Day International debut against Sri Lanka Women on 20 March 2018.

In October 2018, she was named in Pakistan's squad for the 2018 ICC Women's World Twenty20 tournament in the West Indies.

References

External links
 
 

1995 births
Living people
People from Azad Kashmir
Pakistani women cricketers
Pakistan women One Day International cricketers
Pakistan women Twenty20 International cricketers
Higher Education Commission women cricketers
Hyderabad (Pakistan) women cricketers
State Bank of Pakistan women cricketers